K. C. John (born 1947) is a Christian Malayalam orator and author of several Malayalam books. He is the former General President and former General Secretary of The Indian Pentecostal Church of God (IPC), the largest indigenous Pentecostal organisation in India. He is also the founder and chairman of PowerVision TV.

Early life and education 

John was inspired by Edwin Orr to become a born-again believer in 1955.

John completed his schooling at the Government High School, Thalavady and later his graduate degree at U C College, Alwaye, with Physics and Mathematics as his major. In response to a divine call for full-time ministry, he pursued Theological studies at Shalom Bible Institute, Kottayam and Hebron Bible College, Kumbanad. After that, he studied theology at the Seattle Bible College, Seattle, Washington, USA.

Career 
In 1972, he returned from North America to the Indian sub-continent and pioneered the Gospel Centre Church at Nedumpuram in Kerala.

John served as the General President of PYPA (The Pentecostal Young People Association), leading it for several years. Later he served as the State Secretary of the Indian Pentecostal Church of God (IPC) for Kerala for nine years.

John is the founder and chairman of PowerVision TV, India's first indigenous, multilingual, evangelical, Christian television station. It broadcasts in about 52 countries all over Asia from Cyprus in the west to Indonesia in the east. PowerVision TV reaches almost every country in the Middle East as well as Tibet, China.  It is the only licensed station of its kind in India, featuring original local programming.

John was a guest speaker for the World Pentecostal Conference in Nairobi, Kenya, the World Consultation on Evangelism by Evangelicals at Jerusalem, Israel and GONCIL conference in Durban, South Africa.

Publications 
Besides serving as the Chief Editor of The Pentecostal Theology published by Readers publications, John has authored several books which include, A historical study of the Bible, Springs in The Desert, Deep waters of Jordan, Future of the World and A Scientific View of God. More than 800,000 copies of The Church in the Wilderness, an audio teaching series, have been distributed around the world.

Personal life 
He is married to Praise John who hails from Kerala. They  have three children.

References

External links
PowerVision TV
Gospel Center Church

Living people
1947 births
Protestant missionaries in India
Indian Pentecostals
Indian evangelicals
Indian Protestant missionaries
Pentecostal missionaries